Jiaganj Azimganj is a city and a municipality in Murshidabad district in the Indian state of West Bengal.

Geography

Location
Jiaganj and Azimganj- the two towns located on opposite sides of the Baghirathi River, Jiaganj (Ziaganj) on the east bank and Azimganj on the west bank.

Baluchar is the original ancestral name of Jiaganj. The name was changed to Jiaganj after the Mughal Empire conquered Bengal, and came in power of Murshidabad.

Area overview
While the Lalbag subdivision is spread across both the natural physiographic regions of the district, Rarh and Bagri, the Domkal subdivision occupies the north-eastern corner of Bagri. In the map alongside, the Ganges/ Padma River flows along the northern portion. The border with Bangladesh can be seen in the north and the east. Murshidabad district shares with Bangladesh a porous international border which is notoriously crime prone (partly shown in this map). The Ganges has a tendency to change course frequently, causing severe erosion, mostly along the southern bank. The historic city of Murshidabad, a centre of major tourist attraction, is located in this area. In 1717, when Murshid Quli Khan became Subahdar, he made Murshidabad the capital of Subah Bangla (then Bengal, Bihar and Odisha). The entire area is overwhelmingly rural with over 90% of the population living in the rural areas.

Note: The map alongside presents some of the notable locations in the subdivisions. All places marked in the map are linked in the larger full screen map.

Demographics
 India census, Jiaganj Azimganj had a population of 47,228. Males constitute 51% of the population and females 49%. Jiaganj and Azimganj has an average literacy rate of 68% : male literacy is 73%, and female literacy is 62%. In Jiaganj Azimganj, 11% of the population is under 6 years of age.

Neighbourhoods

Begamganj
Begamganj is a very old locality in Jiaganj. The main marketplace in Jiaganj (e.g. SabjiMandi) is within this locality. The Boro Govinda Bari is a place of religious interest. The Sarbajanani Durga Puja in Baroaritala and Saraswatitala is famous and old one.

Shibtalaghat
It is a locality in jiaganj near the Bhagirathi river. Bikki Khela Ghar, Anjali Villa, an ancient Shiva temple etc. are located here.

Bhattapara

Bhattapara is a locality at Jiaganj town named after Bhattacharyas, who used to live here (more than 350 years) from the earlier time of Nawab Murshid Kuli Khan (Subedar of Bengal) of Murshidabad and the next generations of Bhatta family have been living still now at Bhattapara. "Pathar Bari" temple of Goddess Durga is situated near the bank of the river Bhagirathi at Bhattapara is their ancient architecture. Bhattas (Bhattacharyas) were also one of the old Landlord (Lakheraj i.e. Non-Taxable Zamindary). They were also Hindu Paschatya Vaidic Brahmins. Originally they came from Kanauj (U.P) at the time of King Ballal Sen/ Laxman Sen. They have also a temple of "Laxmi-Narayan Dev" adjacent to their residential house. Most of their buildings are now dilapidated and abandoned condition. The descendants of the said Bhattacharyas are commonly known as their glorious title "Bhatta".

Rampada Chakraborty (1831 A.D.) of Bhattapara was the first priest of Amaipara Goddess 'Kali'. The only one Girls' High School of Jiaganj was started in 1937 at Bhattapara under the tenancy of Landowners (Zaminder): Priya Nath Bhatta & Manindra Nath Bhatta being patronized and founded by Rai Bahadur Surendra Narayan Singha. In Bhattapara was residence of several landlords from British India. Most prominent of them is Manmothonath Saha and Sripath Sing. There is a college named "Sripath Sing College" made by Sripath Sing Dugar. Also a temple of Lord Krishna (Thakur Bari) made by Manmothonath Saha. There was also a famous house named "Kartik Bari" where taxes was used to be collected when Manmothonath Saha was a landlord (up to 1965). Every year a puja of Lord Kartik (another Hindu God) was used to be held there in "Kartik Bari". Netaji Subhas Chandra Bose visited Kartik Bari before independence (before 1947). A gigantic sweet (Chomchom) was made in his honour. Author S.K.Roy has written a lot about Bhattapara and Jiaganj in his books. The title Bhatta was given by the Nawab of Murshidabad.

Debipur
Debipur a small neighbourhood situated on the banks of Bhagirathi-Hooghly river, traditionally known as 'Ganga'. Debipur constitutes the ward number 8 of Jiaganj-Azimganj Municipality. It consists of Debipur Mahanta Ganapati Das High School and Debipur Sub-Post office.

Azimganj

Azimganj is situated at the west bank of river Bhagirathi. There are two railway stations Azimganj city and Azimganj junction. The old and historic city of Nawab period is situated near Azimganj city railway station.

Azimganj Rajbari
In 18th century, “Sheherwalis” community of businessman from Rajasthan migrated to Murshidabad. They worked tirelessly to create their empires in textile and banking and went on to become Zamindars. The Sheherwalis adapted to the then prevalent cultural influences in the region namely, Mughal, British, Bengali and European and as such created their own unique culture over generations. They settled in the twin cities of Azimganj-Jiaganj. The most notable Sheherwali was Jagat Seth (literally, ‘universal banker’, title accorded by the Mughal empire).

The sheherwalis are known to have their own dialect, cuisine, culture and lifestyle. A typical picture of early 1900s of a Sheherwali will showcase a Rajasthani turban, a Bengal influenced dhoti, a British walking stick and a Mughal kurta-styled upper wear. Like the melange of cultures in their clothing, Sheherwali cuisine is also deeply influenced by Rajasthani, Mughal and Bengali flavours and ingredients. Being staunch Jains, the cuisine only uses non-root vegetables and has strong Gujarati influence in its dishes. The architecture in Sheherwali palaces (nowadays as Azimganj Rajbari) also reflected this melange - you would find a British room right across a Rajasthani Gaddi Ghar all housed in a building having European pillars.

Azmiganj is also home to the Bari Kothi Heritage Hotel, a restored palace belonging to the Dudhoria family. This is one of many palaces that belonged to the aristocratic merchant families of Murshidabad.

Nehalia
One of the most famous place in Jiaganj. It is the birthplace of freedom fighters. Durgapada Singha, Shyamsundar Singha Choudhury, Anil Singha, Umapada Ghosh, Ashit Ghosh, Kalinarayan Singha are few of them. These people played a very vital role in the famous Nashhipure incident.

Nehalia is renowned for its Historical Museum, Roybahadur's Palace, "Hat" (A local fair arranged on every Wednesday).

Education 
Notable Schools: St.Joseph's School,Jiaganj; Raja Bijoy Singh Vidyamandir (old name Edward Coronation Institution), Azimganj Rai Budh Singh Bahadur High School, Azimganj Keshore Kumari Balika Vidyalaya, Birendra Singh Singhi High School, Surendra Narayan Girls High School, Amaipara High School, Netaji Subhash Chandra Bose DAV School, Debipur High School, Sadhakbag High School

Sripat Singh College was established in 1949 at Jiaganj. The Svetambara Jain zemindar of Jiaganj, Sripat Singh Dugar, gifted the palatial out-house of his palace and a handsome sum in cash for the college. Affiliated with the University of Kalyani, it offers honours courses in Bengali, history, philosophy, political science, economics, physics, chemistry, mathematics and botany, and post graduation in Bengali.

Rani Dhanya Kumari College was initially started as an evening college in the premises of Sripat Singh College in 1962 at Jiaganj. It shifted to its present premises in 1972. Affiliated with the University of Kalyani, it offers honours courses in Bengali, English, sociology, political science, history, geography and BCom.

Rajmati Parichand Bothra Memorial Jiaganj College of Engineering and Technology at Jiaganj offers diploma courses in engineering.

Jiaganj Institute of Education & Training, Baluchar PTTI, Vivekanada Teachers' Training Institute, Jiaganj School of Nursing Training

Municipality
Jiaganj-Azimganj Municipality was established in 1896. From the British reign, most famous personalities came to the post of chairman and had their greatest activity for the development of this Municipality. The present chairman of Jiaganj and Azimganj Municipality is Sri Prasenjit Ghosh. Several writ petitions came to be filed relating to removal of the Chairman of Jiaganj Azimganj Municipality on the basis of the requisition dated 24 March 2017 signed by nine councillors including the petitioner under Section 18(3) of the West Bengal Municipal Act, 1993.
Jiaganj-Azimganj Municipality is one of the oldest municipalities in Murshidabad district. The twin town is situated on the opposite banks of the river Bhagirathi, a branch of river Ganges. Jiaganj (24.23°N 88.27°E) is on the east side while Azimganj (24.23°N 88.25°E) is on the west. The municipal area is surrounded by Murshidabad town in the south, vast land of Bhagabangolla in the North and while in the east and west sides by the Rada area of Nabagram and Sagardighi. This conglomeration of ancient Gauda (North Bengal) and Rada area constituting this municipality was a part of Murshidabad municipality till 1896 when it was curved out as a separate municipal area. These two riparian settlements remind the rich history and cultural heritage of Bengal. The twin towns of Jiaganj and Azimganj were important trade centre during the Subah reign in Bengal, considered as the ‘Baranasi of Bengal’ during the period of Rani Bhabani, a renowned landlord of Bengal. It was also a holy place for Vaishnava culture in some point of time in the past. Because of the abundance of silk, muslin, ivory and rich agricultural yield the entire area had become the centre of vigorous economic activities during the nineteenth century Bengal. Attracted by the promise of trade and banking several families, especially Jains settled here, many Jain temples on both banks of the river of standing tall till date are the witnesses for the same. Traversing over hundred years since today this historic municipal town is inhabited by people of all religion, caste, creed, language, and culture and the municipal area is embellished and honoured with the harmonious existence of Temples, Mosques, Churches and Gurudwara in it.

Connectivity
There are two parallel railway links on both the sides of river Bhagirathi. One is connecting Sealdah to Jiaganj through Lalgola branch line and another Howrah to Azimganj through Barharwa–Azimganj–Katwa loop. A new rail bridge is coming up over river Bhagirathi connecting Nashipur to Azimganj. Azimganj-Nalhati Railway line started in 1872.

Important train that originates from Azimganj Junction railway station :
 Ganadevata Express (Daily)
 Howrah–Malda Town Intercity Express (Daily)
 Nabadwip Dham–Malda Town Express (Daily)

Apart from this through road links, Jiaganj is connected to adjacent townships like Lalbagh (Murshidabad), Berhampore, Lalgola, Bhagabangola.

Important train that goes through Jiaganj railway station :
 Bhagirathi Express (Daily)
 Hazarduari Express (Daily)
 Dhano Dhanye Express

Jiaganj and Azimganj are connected by boat service managed by local municipality on river Bhagirathi.

Jain temples
There are several historic Jain temples in the city including Sri Neminath Swami, Chintamani Parasnath, Shantinath, Gaudi Parshwanath, Padmaprabhu, and Sanwalia Parasnath (Rambagh) temples and a dadabadi at Rambagh.

Jiaganj 1. Shree Shambhabnath Ji, 2. Shree Adinath Ji, 3. Shree Bimalnath Ji, 4. Shree Adinath Ji, Kathgola temple, 5. Dadabari at Kiratbagh, 6. Basupujya Parswanath Swami Jinalaya at Kiratbagh, Mahavir Swami Digambar Jain Mandir.

Healthcare
Jiagnj Rural Hospital functions with 30 beds at Jiaganj and Azimganj Primary Health Centre at Azimganj functions with 15 beds.

Notable people
 Arijit Singh, Playback singer
 Mir Afsar Ali, News presenter, actor and Radio jockey of Radio Mirchi
 Indra Dugar, Painter
 Bidhayak Bhattacharya Scriptwriter, actor, author
Hari Makhan Das and his disciple Radharani Devi, who was also a noted film-actress of 1930s-40s, a contemporary co-actress of Kanan Bala.

References

Sources
Indian trains
Official site of Jiaganj Azimganj Municipality
Personal website of Jiaganj Azimganj Murshidabad Town
DEBIPUR M. G. D. HIGH SCHOOL JIAGANJ-AZIMGANJ (M)

Cities and towns in Murshidabad district
Cities in West Bengal